Luis Alberto Pérez-Rionda (born August 16, 1969) is a former sprinter from Cuba who won an Olympic bronze medal in the 4 x 100 metres relay in Sydney 2000. His personal best of 10.18 (100 metres) was set in 1997.

References

1969 births
Living people
Cuban male sprinters
Athletes (track and field) at the 1996 Summer Olympics
Athletes (track and field) at the 2000 Summer Olympics
Olympic athletes of Cuba
Olympic bronze medalists for Cuba
Athletes (track and field) at the 1999 Pan American Games
Medalists at the 2000 Summer Olympics
Olympic bronze medalists in athletics (track and field)
Universiade medalists in athletics (track and field)
Central American and Caribbean Games bronze medalists for Cuba
Goodwill Games medalists in athletics
Central American and Caribbean Games gold medalists for Cuba
Competitors at the 1998 Central American and Caribbean Games
Universiade silver medalists for Cuba
Central American and Caribbean Games medalists in athletics
Competitors at the 1998 Goodwill Games
Pan American Games competitors for Cuba
20th-century Cuban people
21st-century Cuban people